Leonia is a genus of gastropods belonging to the family Pomatiidae.

The species of this genus are found in Mediterranean and North Africa.

Species:

Leonia mamillaris 
Leonia scrobiculata

References

Pomatiidae